Miho Saeki and Yuka Yoshida were the defending champions, but did not compete this year.

Lisa Raymond and Samantha Stosur won the title by defeating Victoria Azarenka and Caroline Wozniacki 7–6(7–2), 6–3 in the final.

Seeds

Draw

Draw

Qualifying draw

Seeds

Qualifiers
  Varvara Lepchenko /  Tatiana Panova

Lucky losers
  Tetiana Luzhanska /  Yaroslava Shvedova

Draw

References
 Main and Qualifying Rounds
 ITF tournament profile

Cellular South Cup - Doubles
U.S. National Indoor Championships